Statistics of UAE Football League in season 1975–76.

Overview
Al-Ahli Football Club - Dubai won the championship.
Ali Nawaz Baloch of Pakistan emerged as top scorer with 13 goals.

League standings

References
United Arab Emirates - List of final tables (RSSSF)

UAE Pro League seasons
1
Emir